Hesperapis regularis is an oligolectic bee in the family Melittidae.

Distribution
This bee is native to California, and inhabits meadows, fields, and gardens, where it visits only flowers in the genus Clarkia. Numerous native species of Clarkia are found in California chaparral and woodlands, montane, and valley habitats.

Description
The bees eat nectar, but their larvae feed upon a mass composed of both nectar and Clarkia pollen, placed in chambers underground.

See also

References 

Melittidae
Fauna of California
Fauna of the California chaparral and woodlands
Insects of the United States
Hymenoptera of North America
Taxa named by Ezra Townsend Cresson